Itashino is a rural locality (a passing loop) in Rabochy Posyolok Erofey Pavlovich of Skovorodinsky District, Amur Oblast, Russia. The population was 6 as of 2018.

Geography 
Itashino is located 149 km west of Skovorodino (the district's administrative centre) by road. Yagodny is the nearest rural locality.

References 

Rural localities in Skovorodinsky District